Harbin–Manzhouli railway, abbreviated as the Binzhou Railway, is a double-track electrified trunk railway in Northeast China between Harbin and Manzhouli on the Russian border, where it connects to the Trans-Siberian Railway via Zabaikalsk, Russia.

The Binzhou railway begins in the west at Manzhouli and runs eastward across the Hulunbuir grasslands, through the forests of the Greater Khingan range, the oilfields of Daqing, and the rich farmland of the Songhua River valley to Harbin. Major cities and towns along route include Manzhouli, Jalainur, Hailar, Dayan, Yakeshi, and Zhalantun in Inner Mongolia, as well as Qiqihar, Daqing, Anda, Zhaodong, and Harbin in Heilongjiang.

This line has the only station in all of China whose name is a single character: Song railway station (宋), which makes it a popular location amongst Chinese railfans.

History
Twenty-two years after the First Sino-Japanese War of 1896, the Qing government's special envoy Li Hongzhang went to Russia to congratulate Tsar Nicholas II on his coronation, and signed the Sino–Russian Secret Treaty; amongst other things, this treaty gave Russia the right to build a railway through northeast China - the Chinese Eastern Railway (CER). Harbin was selected to be the hub of the new railway system, with three Russian-gauge lines  envisioned heading east, west, and south from Harbin. Work on the western branch from Harbin to the Russian border at Manzhouli, then named the Haman Railway, commenced at both ends in June 1898, and was completed in 1902. The eastern branch of the CER ran from Harbin to Suifenhe. The entire CER served as an alternative route to the Trans-Siberian Railway.

The CER was a joint project of China and Russia, and after the Russo-Japanese War, the Japanese took over the southern portion of the CER, forming the South Manchuria Railway, with the northern portions remaining under Sino-Russian control. Following the October Revolution, the railway was controlled by White Russians for a time during the Russian Civil War, but from 1917 the government of the Republic of China began taking more control of the railway to itself, until in 1922 the CER was made officially a Sino-Soviet joint enterprise. However, in 1929 the Chinese seized complete control of the CER, storming the Soviet consulate in Harbin and arresting the officials of the CER. This led to the Sino-Soviet conflict of 1929, in which the Soviets quickly defeated the Chinese army and forced the Chinese to once again accept joint control of the railway. After the Mukden Incident, the Soviets retained control over the railway despite the Japanese occupation of northeastern China; after the establishment of Manchukuo in 1932, the CER became a joint Soviet-Manchukuo enterprise called the "North Manchuria Railway". In March 1935, the government of Manchukuo bought the Soviet share of the NMR for 140 million yen, and the entire network was taken over by the Manchukuo National Railway.

After the Soviet invasion of Manchuria and the subsequent collapse of Manchukuo, the Soviets once again took control of the region's railways, and converted the Binzhou Line back to Russian gauge; in 1946, the Northeast Democratic Coalition seized control of the line, and once again regauged it. After the creation of the People's Republic of China, the railways in the territory of the former Manchukuo were taken over by a new Sino-Soviet joint enterprise, called the China Changchun Railway. Full control of the China Changchun Railway was to be turned over to the PRC on 31 December 1952, but due to the Korean War this was delayed until 1955. The Harbin–Manzhouli line became part of China Railway at that time, and once again renamed, becoming the Binzhou Railway.

The Harbin-Manzhouli line has undergone substantial upgrades over the years. Double-tracking began in 1983, with the Harbin–Anda section being the first section to be completed, in 1985; the entire line was completed in 2007, when the Manzhouli–Hailar section was completed, increasing the line's capacity sixfold. In 1990, semi-automatic train control was introduced, with DFH3-class diesel locomotives on passenger trains, and DF4B-class diesels and Renmin-class steam locomotives on freight trains.

The Binzhou Railway Electrification Project was officially started on 25 October 2014. The entire  of the line was wired, and 17 new traction substations were built. The first section, from Harbin to Qiqihar, was completed on 3 November 2016; the first electric-hauled train on the line was K7108, pulled by a HXD3D-class locomotive. The remaining section from Qiqihar to Manzhouli was energised on 11 December 2017.

The Eastern end of the route was quadruple tracked in 2015 with the opening of the Harbin–Qiqihar intercity railway, dedicated to passenger service, increasing the passenger-carrying capacity of this section.

The original Binzhou Railway Bridge was built in 1901, and was replaced by a new bridge in 2014. The old bridge is now a historical landmark protected by the city of Harbin.

Route

References

Railway lines in China
Rail transport in Heilongjiang
Rail transport in Inner Mongolia
Railway lines in Manchukuo
Railway lines opened in 1902